Kenneth "Apple" Green (born September 19, 1959) is an American former National Basketball Association (NBA) player for the New York Knicks. Green played for Pan American University, where he led the Broncs to the 1981 NIT tournament, the school's only Division I post-season appearance. During this season Green was an NCAA honorable mention All American.  Green was drafted with the eleventh pick in the second round of the 1981 NBA Draft by the Denver Nuggets; however, the Nuggets waived Green before the start of the 1981-82 NBA season. He was signed by the Portland Trail Blazers before the 1985–86 NBA season, but was once again waived before the start of the season. On March 25, 1986, the New York Knicks signed Green to a 10-day contract and then signed him to a contract for the rest of the season on April 4, 1986. In seven games with the Knicks, Green averaged 4.4 points per game and 3.9 rebounds per game.

References

External links
 

1959 births
Living people
American men's basketball players
Basketball players from Georgia (U.S. state)
Cedar Rapids Silver Bullets players
Denver Nuggets draft picks
Florida Stingers players
Montana Golden Nuggets players
New York Knicks players
Power forwards (basketball)
Quad City Thunder players
Ranger Rangers men's basketball players
Rochester Zeniths players
Rockford Lightning players
Sarasota Stingers players
Savannah Spirits players
Texas–Pan American Broncs men's basketball players
Topeka Sizzlers players
Tulsa Fast Breakers players